Berberis thunbergii, the Japanese barberry, Thunberg's barberry, or red barberry, is a species of flowering plant in the barberry family Berberidaceae, native to Japan and eastern Asia, though widely naturalized in China and North America, where it has become a problematic invasive in many places, leading to declines in species diversity, increased tick habitat, and soil changes.

Description
B. thunbergii has deeply grooved, brown, spiny branches with a single (occasionally tridentine) spine (actually a highly modified leaf) at each shoot node. They mature during late summer and fall and persist through the winter.

Identification
This species is sometimes confused with Berberis canadensis (American barberry), Berberis vulgaris (common or European barberry), and other deciduous Berberis species; it is most readily distinguished by the flowers being produced in umbels, not racemes.

Cultivation

Berberis thunbergii is widely grown as an ornamental plant, both in Japan and elsewhere in the temperate Northern Hemisphere. Numerous cultivars have been selected, including plants selected for yellow, dark red to violet, or variegated foliage, erect growth (for hedge use), and dwarf size.

In cultivation in the UK, the following have gained the Royal Horticultural Society's Award of Garden Merit:

B. thunbergii 'Fireball'
B. thunbergii 'Maria'
B. thunbergii f. atropurpurea 'Admiration'
B. thunbergii f. atropurpurea 'Atropurpurea Nana'
B. thunbergii f. atropurpurea 'Concorde'
B. thunbergii f. atropurpurea 'Dart's Red Lady'
B. thunbergii f. atropurpurea 'Golden Ring'
B. thunbergii f. atropurpurea 'Harlequin'
B. thunbergii f. atropurpurea 'Rose Glow'

Invasive species

Japanese barberry can be found in most northeastern and Great Lakes states of the United States. A current map of its distribution can be found at the Early Detection and Distribution Mapping System (EDDmapS). In recent years, Berberis thunbergii has been recognized as an invasive species in many parts of the eastern United States. The Plant Conservation Alliance's Alien Plant Working Group lists it among its "Least Wanted". Japanese barberry is prohibited from being a seed contaminant in Michigan and banned from sale in Massachusetts. This species is ranked "Very High" on the New York State Threat Assessment scale.

This Berberis is avoided by deer, and has been replacing native species. Furthermore, the plant can raise the pH of the soil and affect soil nitrogen levels. Unlike B. canadensis and B. vulgaris, B. thunbergii does not act as a host for Puccinia graminis (black rust), a rust pathogen of wheat. B. thunbergii, however, naturally hybridizes with B. vulgaris, and the offspring can be susceptible to P. graminis.

Japanese barberry provides an exceptionally favorable environment for ticks due to the high humidity present in barberry's dense foliage. It is hypothesized that spread of barberry is correlated with the spread of Lyme disease. Tick numbers are higher in areas with thick barberry understories, as opposed to areas with controlled barberry or no barberry. In one study,  in a barberry infected area, while only  in otherwise similar area with no barberry present.

Detailed information on how to control Japanese barberry is available in a Michigan Department of Natural Resources document.

Gallery

References

External links

US National Park Service: Berberis thunbergii (deals with the species as an invasive species)
Native Wildlife Garden (concerning lyme disease in relation to barberry stands)
 Species Profile - Japanese Barberry (Berberis thunbergii). National Invasive Species Information Center, United States National Agricultural Library.
 Invasive Species—Best Control Practices, Japanese barberry Michigan Department of Natural Resources.

thunbergii
Flora of China
Flora of Japan
Plants described in 1821
Taxa named by Karl Maximovich